Omar-S (real name Alexander Omar Smith) is an electronic music producer from Detroit, Michigan, United States.

Discography

Albums 
 Just Ask The Lonely (FXHE, 2005)
 111 (2006)
 It Can Be Done But Only I Can Do It (2011)
 Thank You For Letting Me Be Myself (2013)
 The Best (2016)
 You Want (2020)
 Can't Change (2022)
 Can't Explain (2022)
 The Laugh (2022)

EPs 
 002 (FHXHE, 2003)
 003 (2004)
 Track #8 (2004)
 004 (2004)
 001 (2004)
 007 (2005)
 In Side My Head (2005)
 U (2005)
 Side-Trakx-Volume-#-1 (2006)
 006 (2006)
 008 (2007)
 Psychotic Photosynthesis (2007)
 Thirteen/Two/Eight (with Shadow Ray) (2007)
 Side-Trakx-Volume#2 (2008)
 The Further You Look - The Less You Will See (2008)
 1 Out of 853 Beats / Hot Ones Echo Thru The Ghetto (2009)
 Still Serious Nic (2009)
 Brown Valvetrane (Sound Signature, 2009)
 Jive Time (FXHE, 2010)
 Da-Teys (2010)
 These Complimentary Track'x (2010)
 Here's Your Trance Now Dance!! (2011)
 High School Graffiti (2011)
 Sarah (2011)
 Triangulum Australe (Say It In Space) (2012)
 S.E.X. - The Remixes (ft. L'Renee) (2012)
 -998 (2012)
 Wayne County Hill Cop's (Part.2) (with OB Ignitt) (2012)
 Nelson County (2013)
 Annoying Mumbling Alkaholik (2014)
 Motown Methods E.P. (with Luke Hess) (DeepLabs, 2014)
 Romancing The Stone! (FXHE, 2014)
 Side Trak'x Vol 4 (2015)
 The 90's Evolution Of What Is Was (with OB Ignitt) (Obonit, 2015)
 Side Trakx - Volume #3 (FXHE, 2015)
 I Wanna Know (2015)

Mix Albums 

 FYA Detroit (FXHE, 2005)
 FYA#2 Detroit (2006)
 O+N Detroit (2006)
 1992 (2008)
 Fabric 45 (Fabric, 2009)
 FYA#5 (FXHE, 2010)
 Extract Mix (2011)
 FXHE 10 Year Compilation Mix 1 (2014)
 FXHE 10 Year Compilation Mix 2 (2014)

See also 
 Music of Detroit, Michigan

References 

House musicians
Detroit techno
American electronic musicians
American house musicians